John Thornell (born 22 April 1985) is an Australian long jumper.

He was born in Sydney. He finished eleventh at the 2001 World Youth Championships, sixth at the 2002 World Junior Championships, won the bronze medal at the 2004 World Junior Championships and finished fifth at the 2006 Commonwealth Games.

His personal best jump is 8.08 metres, achieved in January 2006 in Canberra.

References

1985 births
Living people
Australian male long jumpers
Athletes (track and field) at the 2006 Commonwealth Games
Commonwealth Games competitors for Australia
Athletes from Sydney